The 1978 Oakland Athletics season was the team's eleventh in Oakland, California. The team sought to rebound from its first losing season in a decade (a 63-98 result in 1977). Despite low expectations, the Athletics remained competitive for nearly three-quarters of the season. Despite posting a respectable 61-56 mark through 117 games, the Athletics collapsed in the season's final weeks; their 8-37 finish ensured a second consecutive season of fewer than 70 wins.

Only one player (Billy North) remained from the team's 1974 championship season. He would be traded to the Dodgers in May.

Prior to the season, owner Charlie Finley nearly sold the team to buyers who would have moved them to Denver.

Offseason 
 February 25, 1978: Doug Bair and cash were traded by the Athletics to the Cincinnati Reds for Dave Revering.
 March 15, 1978: Vida Blue was traded by the Athletics to the San Francisco Giants for Gary Alexander, Gary Thomasson, Dave Heaverlo, Alan Wirth, John Henry Johnson, Phil Huffman, a player to be named later, and $300,000. The Giants completed the deal by sending Mario Guerrero to the Athletics on April 7.
 March 25, 1978: Sheldon Mallory was traded by the Athletics to the Toronto Blue Jays for Steve Staggs.
 March 28, 1978: Dick Allen was released by the Athletics.
 March 28, 1978: Mark Williams was released by the Athletics.

Vida Blue trade 
The trade of Vida Blue was a very complicated deal for A's owner Charles O. Finley. At the end of the 1977 season, Finley attempted to trade Vida Blue to the Cincinnati Reds for a player of lesser stature and cash, but baseball commissioner Bowie Kuhn vetoed the deal. The commissioner claimed that it was tantamount to the sale of the star pitcher to the Yankees that the commissioner voided during 1976. The commissioner claimed that adding Blue to the Reds' already formidable pitching staff would make a mockery of the National League West race. Instead, Blue was traded across the bay to the San Francisco Giants in a multi-player trade that received the commissioner's blessing.

Proposed sale 
After the 1977 season, Charlie Finley had heart bypass surgery and his health was in decline. He had received offers from groups in New Orleans and Washington, D.C., and from billionaire oilman Marvin Davis from Denver. In December 1977, Finley agreed to sell the Athletics to Marvin Davis for 12.5 million dollars. The franchise would move to Denver for the 1978 season. The American League owners approved the sale and the transfer of the franchise. The board of the Oakland Coliseum had prepared a lawsuit against Finley, as there were still 10 years left on their stadium lease. Bowie Kuhn and San Francisco Giants owner Bob Lurie worked with Finley to attempt to find a compromise that would allow the Athletics to leave Oakland.

Regular season

Season standings

Record vs. opponents

Notable transactions 
 April 4, 1978: Manny Sanguillén was traded by the Athletics to the Pittsburgh Pirates for Miguel Diloné, Elías Sosa and a player to be named later. The Pirates completed the deal by sending Mike Edwards to the Athletics on April 7.
 May 22, 1978: Joe Coleman was purchased from the Athletics by the Toronto Blue Jays.
 June 15, 1978: Gary Alexander was traded by the Athletics to the Cleveland Indians for Joe Wallis.
 June 15, 1978: Gary Thomasson was traded by the Athletics to the New York Yankees for Mickey Klutts, Dell Alston and $50,000.
 June 20, 1978: Tito Fuentes was signed as a free agent by the Athletics.
 July 13, 1978: Willie Horton was signed as a free agent by the Athletics.
 July 26, 1978: Tito Fuentes was released by the Athletics.
 August 15, 1978: Willie Horton and Phil Huffman were traded by the Athletics to the Toronto Blue Jays for Rico Carty.

Draft picks
 June 6, 1978: 1978 Major League Baseball Draft
Keith Atherton was drafted by the Athletics in the 2nd round.
 June 6, 1978: Kelvin Moore was drafted by the Athletics in the 6th round.

Roster

Player stats

Batting

Starters by position 
Note: Pos = Position; G = Games played; AB = At bats; H = Hits; Avg. = Batting average; HR = Home runs; RBI = Runs batted in

Other batters 
Note: G = Games played; AB = At bats; H = Hits; Avg. = Batting average; HR = Home runs; RBI = Runs batted in

Pitching

Starting pitchers 
Note: G = Games pitched; IP = Innings pitched; W = Wins; L = Losses; ERA = Earned run average; SO = Strikeouts

Other pitchers 
Note: G = Games pitched; IP = Innings pitched; W = Wins; L = Losses; ERA = Earned run average; SO = Strikeouts

Relief pitchers 
Note: G = Games pitched; W = Wins; L = Losses; SV = Saves; ERA = Earned run average; SO = Strikeouts

Farm system

References

External links
1978 Oakland Athletics team page at Baseball Reference
1978 Oakland Athletics team page at www.baseball-almanac.com

Oakland Athletics seasons
Oakland Athletics season
Oakland